Sir John Lancelot Stirling,  (5 November 1849 – 24 May 1932), generally known as Sir Lancelot Stirling, was an Australian politician and grazier. He was a member of the South Australian House of Assembly from 1881 to 1887, representing Mount Barker, and 1888 to 1890, representing Gumeracha. He was then a member of the South Australian Legislative Council from 1891 to 1932, representing the Southern District. He was President of the Legislative Council from 1901 to 1932 and was Chief Secretary in the seven-day Solomon Ministry of 1899.

Early life
Stirling was born at Strathalbyn, South Australia, the son of Edward Stirling (1804–1873) and his wife Harriett, née Taylor and brother of Sir Edward Charles Stirling. His father was the illegitimate child of a Scottish planter in Jamaica and an unknown woman of colour.

Stirling was educated at St Peter's College, Adelaide and Trinity College, Cambridge, where he graduated B.A. and LL.B
Stirling was a good athlete and, representing Cambridge against Oxford, won the 120 yards hurdles. Stirling also won the amateur championship of England in this event in 1870 and again in 1872, his time in the latter year being 16.8 seconds, considered a good performance at that time.

Career
Stirling read for the bar and was admitted at the Inner Temple in 1872, but never practised. Stirling returned to South Australia soon afterwards, became a pastoralist, and bred prize horses and merino sheep. He entered the South Australian Legislative Assembly in 1881 for Mount Barker, which he held until April 1887, and afterwards represented Gumeracha until 1890, when he became a member of the then-conservative South Australian Legislative Council, representing the Southern District. In December 1899 Stirling was chief secretary in the  conservative Solomon government but this ministry was defeated as soon as the house met. In 1901 Stirling was elected President of the South Australian Legislative Council, and would serve in the position for a record 31 years.

Stirling was made a knight bachelor on 14 August 1902, after the honour had been announced in the 1902 Coronation Honours list published on 26 June 1902. He was appointed a Knight Commander of the Order of St Michael and St George (KCMG) in 1909 and Officer of the Order of the British Empire (OBE) in 1918.

He continued his interest in sport all his life, pioneering polo in South Australia and captaining the team which twice beat Victoria. For a time Stirling was master of the Adelaide Hounds and was a well-known figure at racing meetings. He was a member of the Royal Agricultural and Horticultural Society and its president from 1891 to 1893; he was president of the Society for the Prevention of Cruelty to Animals, the Pastoralists' Association, the St Peter's Old Collegians Association, the South Australian Zoological and Acclimatization Society, and was a member of the Adelaide University council. He was a member of the Caledonian Society of South Australia, and its Chief 1885–1886.

Stirling also possessed a good business sense and was a director of well-known companies. In politics he was respected as a man of individuality but not regarded as a first-rate speaker. Stirling found his ideal position as president of the council, admirably carrying out his duties; as the years passed becoming a kind of elder brother to the newer members.

Family
On 2 December 1882, Stirling married Florence Marion, daughter of Sir William Milne and was survived by his wife, three sons and two daughters. His elder daughter Madge Mary Stirling (1887–1940) married Knox Lister Colley (1885 – 7 December 1934) on 28 January 1914. Knox was a grandson of R. B. Colley, first mayor of Glenelg.

References

1849 births
1932 deaths
Members of the South Australian Legislative Council
Members of the South Australian House of Assembly
Australian Knights Bachelor
Australian Knights Commander of the Order of St Michael and St George
Australian politicians awarded knighthoods
Australian Officers of the Order of the British Empire
Presidents of the South Australian Legislative Council
People educated at St Peter's College, Adelaide
Liberal and Country League politicians
People from Strathalbyn, South Australia
Burials at North Road Cemetery
Australian people of Jamaican descent
Australian people of Scottish descent